Edwin James Houston (July 9, 1847 – March 1, 1914) was an American electrical engineer, academic, businessman, inventor and writer.

Biography
Houston was born July 9, 1847, to John Mason and Mary (Lamour) Houston in Alexandria, Virginia. He graduated from Central High School of Philadelphia  (a degree-granting institution rather than an ordinary high school) in 1864.  He received both his Bachelor of Arts and master's degree from the same Central High School, where he then became professor of civil engineering for a short period before holding its chair of Natural Philosophy and Physical Geography. Princeton University awarded him an honorary doctoral degree. He also served as emeritus professor of physics at the Franklin Institute and professor of physics at the Medico-Chirurgical College.

While teaching physics at Central High School in Philadelphia, he helped design an arc light generator with his former student colleague Elihu Thomson. Together, they created the Thomson-Houston Electric Company in 1882 which soon after moved to Lynn, Massachusetts. He served as chief electrician of Philadelphia's International Electrical Exhibition in 1884.

In 1892, Thomson-Houston merged with the Edison General Electric Company to form General Electric, with management from Thomson-Houston largely running the new company. In 1894, Houston formed a consulting firm in electrical engineering with Arthur Kennelly. He and Kennelly had also jointly published a series called "Primers of Electricity" in 1884.

Houston was twice president of the American Institute of Electrical Engineers (1893–1895). He was a member of the United States Electrical Commission, the American Institute of Mining Engineers, the American Philosophical Society and many others. He also authored books for a series called "The Wonder Books of Science" to include The Wonder Book of Volcanoes and Earthquakes, The Wonder Book of the Atmosphere,  The Wonder Book of Light, and the Wonder Book of Magnetism.  He died from heart failure in Philadelphia on March 1, 1914.

Works

Works by Houston
(Edited list, drawn from January 21, 1911 Electrical Review and Western Electrician p. 125)

Outlines of Natural Philosophy
Easy Lessons in Natural Philosophy
The Measurement of Electric Current
Recent Types of Dynamo-Electric Machinery
Elements of Physical Geology Eldredge & Brother (1878, 1901, 1904)
Intermediate Lessons in Natural Philosophy Eldredge & Brother (1881, 1884)
Elements of Chemistry: for the use of Schools, Academies, and Colleges Eldredge & Brother (1883, 1898)
Primers of Electricity (1884)
International Electric Exhibition of 1884
Short Course in Chemistry (1884)
Electric Furnaces (1888)
Electrical Measurements and Other Advanced Primers of Electricity W.J. Johnston Company, Limited (1893)
The Electric Transmission of Intelligence: and other Advanced Primers of Electricity W. J. Johnston Company, Limited (1893)
Primers of Forestry (1893)
Outlines of Forestry (1893)
Electricity One Hundred Years Ago and Today W.J. Johnston Company, Ltd. (1894)
A Dictionary of Electrical Words, Terms and Phrases (1894) (New York : P. F. Collier, 1902) Vol.1, Vol.2
Electrical Engineering Leaflets (1895)
Alternating Currents (1897, 1906)
Elements of Natural Philosophy (1897)
Arc Lighting (1897, 1906)
Incandescent Lighting (1897, 1906)
Electric Telegraphy McGraw Publishing Co. (1897, 1906)
Pocket Electrical Dictionary (1898)
Electricity and Magnetism: being a Series of Advanced Primers McGraw Publishing Co. (1899)
Electricity in Everyday Life (1904) Vol.3 (1905)
Franklin as a Man of Science (1906)
The Boy Geologist:at School and in Camp Henry Altemus Company (1907)
The Boy Electrician (1907)
The Wonder Book of Volcanoes and Earthquakes Frederick A. Stokes Company (1907, 1908)
The Wonder Book of the Atmosphere Frederick A. Stokes Company (1907)
The Search for the North Pole (1907)
The Discovery of the North Pole (1907)
Cast Away at the North Pole (1907)
In Captivity in the Pacific (1907)
The Wonder Book of the Light (1908)
The Wonder Book of the Magnetism (1908)
Five Months on a Derelict (1908)
Wrecked on a Coral Island (1908)
At School in the Cannibal Islands (1909)
A Chip of the Old Block (1910)

Works by Houston & Kennelly
Alternating Electric Currents The W.J. Johnston Company (1895)
Electrical Engineering Leaflets : Advanced Grade Electrical World & Engineer (1895)
Electrical Engineering Leaflets : Intermediate Grade Electrical World & Engineer (1895)
Electric Heating The W.J. Johnston Company (1895, 1897, 1906)
Electricity in Electro-Therapeutics McGraw Publishing Co. (1896, 1897, 1898, 1903, 1906)
Electric Incandescent Lighting The W.J. Johnston Company (1896)
The Electric Motor and the Transmission Power The W.J. Johnston Company (1896, 1906)
Electric Street Railways The W.J. Johnston Company (1896, 1897, 1906)
Electro-dynamic Machinery for Continuous Currents The W.J. Johnston Company (1896)
Algebra Made Easy American technical Book Company (1897, 1898)
Magnetism McGraw Publishing Company (1897, 1906)
The Electric Telephone McGraw Publishing Company (1897, 1902, 1906)
Electricity Made Easy: by Simple Language and Copious Illustration American Technical Book Company (1898)
Interpretation of Mathematical Formulæ McGraw Publishing Co. (1898, 1900)
Electric Arc Lighting Electrical World & Engineer (1902, 1906)

Works with other collaborators
 Louis Gathmann, Rain Produced At Will Louis Gathmann (1891)
 Alfred Newlin Seal, The Elements of Physics Hinds, Noble & Eldredge (1912)

See also
Thomson-Houston Electric Company

References

External links
 
  

1847 births
1914 deaths
American educators
American business writers
American chief executives
American civil engineers
American electrical engineers
American engineering writers
American inventors
Businesspeople from Alexandria, Virginia
Businesspeople from Pennsylvania
Engineers from Virginia
General Electric people
19th-century American businesspeople
Burials at Laurel Hill Cemetery (Philadelphia)